The Membury transmitting station is a broadcasting and telecommunications facility, situated adjacent to the M4 motorway at the Membury services in the south-west corner of the parish of Lambourn close to the town of Hungerford, in Berkshire. It is owned and operated by Arqiva.

It has a 152.4 m (500 ft) high guyed steel lattice mast. It was constructed by the ITA in 1965 to bring ITV signals (provided by ATV and ABC) to the "South Midlands", including Oxford, Swindon, Newbury and Marlborough on 405-line VHF, using Channel 12 (Band III).

It was not used for any broadcast services for a decade after the closure of 405 line television in 1985. However, in 1995 a low power VHF FM filler for the four national BBC radio networks was added (at 125 watts, vertical polarisation only), improving reception along the M4 corridor between Newbury and Swindon.

In January 2003, a DAB transmitter was added for the NOW Swindon & Wiltshire multiplex. The BBC added a signal for its national DAB services in 2009.

The mast also hosts transmission equipment for numerous mobile telephone networks.

The mast is a highly visible landmark and can be clearly seen from The Ridgeway, White Horse Hill and most of the Lambourn Downs, making it a useful reference point for hikers, ramblers, and aircraft following visual flight rules. The red safety lights which mark the structure at night become visible for eastbound M4 motorists from as early as Swindon East (Junction 15).

Channels listed by frequency

Analogue radio (FM VHF)

Digital radio (DAB)

Analogue television

See also
List of masts
List of tallest buildings and structures in Great Britain
List of radio stations in the United Kingdom

External links

The Transmission Gallery: Membury photographs and information

Radio masts and towers in Europe
Transmitter sites in England
Broadcasting
Lambourn